Yeon Namgeon (淵男建, 연남건) (635 ~ ?) was the second son of the Goguryeo military leader and dictator Yeon Gaesomun (Unknown-665), and third Dae Magniji of Goguryeo during the reign of Goguryeo's last ruler, King Bojang.

Fall of Goguryeo
Following the death of his father in 666, Namgeon became embroiled in a power struggle with his elder brother Yeon Namsaeng. Namgeon and his younger brother Namsan staged a coup against their older brother when he was inspecting all of the fortresses of Goguryeo to prepare for war against the Tang. Namgeon and Namsan's coup forced Namsaeng to surrender to the Tang, and ultimately led to the destruction of Goguryeo.  Namgeon appointed himself Dae Mangniji (대막리지, 大莫離支) and seized control of the government.

During Tang's subsequent invasion of 668, Namgeon led armed resistance to the Chinese forces near the Amnok River and continued to resist the Tang forces all the way to Pyongyang. With Goguryeo's defeat, Namgeon found himself a prisoner of war and was transported to China and later banished to Qianzhou (黔州), in what is today China's Sichuan province, where he apparently died. The tomb steles of Namgeon's siblings Namsaeng and Namsan are extant but offer no particulars regarding the life of Namgeon. Had Namgeon and his brothers united to work together, Goguryeo would have lasted for a much longer period of time, but Silla sent their spies into the brothers' inner circle of advisors to try and create a rift between the brothers.

Popular culture
 Portrayed by Ahn Hong-jin in the 2006-2007 KBS TV series Dae Jo Yeong.
 Portrayed by Kim Hong-pyo in 2006-2007 SBS TV series Yeon Gaesomun.

See also
 Goguryeo
 Bojang of Goguryeo
 Yeon Gaesomun

Notes

Goguryeo
7th-century heads of government
Goguryeo people